ITU-T recommendation T.50 specifies the International Reference Alphabet (IRA), formerly International Alphabet No. 5 (IA5), a character encoding. ASCII is the U.S. variant of that character set.

The original version from November 1988 corresponds to ISO 646. The current version is from September 1992.

History 
At the beginning was the International Telegraph Alphabet No. 2 (ITA2), a five bits code. IA5 is an improvement based on seven bits bytes.

Recommendation V.3 IA5 (1968) Initial version, superseded
Recommendation V.3 IA5 (1972) Superseded
Recommendation V.3 IA5 (1976-10) Superseded
Recommendation V.3 IA5 (1980-11) Superseded
Recommendation T.50 IA5 (1984-10) Superseded
Recommendation T.50 IA5 (1988-11-25) Superseded
Recommendation T.50 IRA (1992-09-18) In force

Use 
This standard is referenced by other standards such as RFC 3966. It is also used by some analog modems such as Cisco ones.

This standard is referenced by other standards such as RFC 3939 - Calling Line Identification for Voice Mail Messages.

Character Set 
The following table shows the IA5 character set. Each character is shown with the hex code of its Unicode equivalent.

Standardisation 
 Identical standard: ISO/IEC 646:1991 (Twinned)

See also 
ITU T.51

References

External links 
 Official ITU-T T.50 page
 Tech Info - Character Codes (IA5 and ISO 646)

Character encoding
Character sets
ITU-T recommendations
ITU-T T Series Recommendations